Charles Percival de Silva (16 April 1912 – 9 October 1972) was a leading Sri Lankan politician and civil servant. He had served as the Minister of Finance, Minister of Lands, Land Development and Agriculture; and Minister of Power and Irrigation, and Chairperson of the Sri Lanka Freedom Party, and later joined as a senior member of the United National Party.

Born in the southern town of Balapitiya, he was educated at St Thomas' College, Mt. Lavinia and studied mathematics at the Ceylon University College and the University of London. Joining the prestigious Ceylon Civil Service, he served as an Assistant Government Agent in the North Central Province, assisting D. S. Senanayake in his agricultural projects in the province and served as Director of Land Development, in the Ministry of Agriculture under Dudley Senanayake, who succeed his father as Minister of Agriculture when the latter became the first Prime Minister of Ceylon. Falling-out with the younger Senanayake, C. P. de Silva resigned from the civil service.

Entering politics from the newly formed Sri Lanka Freedom Party, he played a major role in S. W. R. D. Bandaranaike's landslide victory in the 1965 general elections and became the top cabinet minister. He missed the opportunity to succeed Bandaranaike as prime minister, when the latter was assassinated in 1959 as he himself was in London recovering from a suspect poisoning. Returning to Ceylon he took over the leadership of the Freedom Party, but failed to unit its different fractions and served as opposition leader for a brief period, before engineering the defeat of the United National Party government. But his bid to form a government failed as the Governor General called for fresh elections.

He succeed in establishing Bandaranaike's widow, Sirima Bandaranaike as party leader and gaining the party a major victory in the 1960 July general elections. Having been sidelined by the Sirima Bandaranaike and her loyalists on cast lines, he led thirteen Freedom Party politicians to cross over to the opposition and defeating the government in parliament resulting in fresh elections which the United National Party won with the support his new party, the Sri Lanka Freedom Socialist Party and became a minister in the national government that followed. A strong advocate of agriculture and rural development, he played a major role in many of the large agricultural development projects in the North Central Province. He lost his seat in the 1970 general election, after having served in parliament for eighteen consecutive years.

Early life and education
Born Randombe in Balapitiya to C. R. de Silva, a proctor with a civil practice in Balapitiya and Galle; and Obinamuni Adlin de Silva. He had three brothers and two sisters. His brother A. H. de Silva took over their father's practice and was elected to parliament along with his other brother Merril de Silva, his sister Gladys married R. T. de Silva and the other sister Stella became a pediatrician. His brother Dr L. B. de Silva was a researcher attached to the Medical Research Institute. He was a cousin of Colvin R. de Silva.

He was educated at Dharmasoka College, Ambalangoda and St Thomas' College, Mt. Lavinia, where he won the Gregory Scholarship, the Miller Award and became head boy. Thereafter he attend the Ceylon University College where he gained a BSc in Mathematics (first Class)in 1933. He thereafter attended University of London for postgraduate studies.

Civil service
Having sat for the Ceylon Civil Service (CCS) entrance exam in the United Kingdom, de Silva was admitted in 1935 and on his return to the island was appointed as a cadet in the Jaffna Kachcheri. At aged 23, he was one of the youngest to gain admission to the CCS. Following his completion of training as a cadet, he was appointed as the Assistant Government Agent (AGA) in Puttalam. He was then selected by D. S. Senanayake, Minister of Agriculture to serve as AGA of the Polonnaruwa District in order to carry forward his agricultural projects in the district. In Polonnaruwa, de Silva served under Richard Aluvihare and played a major role in establishing the Minneriya Colonisation Scheme. Thereafter he was posted as Assistant Secretary to the Minister of Agriculture, assisting Senanayake in his agricultural programs. He was then posted as Assistant Government Agent of the Anuradhapura District. In 1945 he was an Assistant Land Commissioner and in 1949 he was promoted to the post of Director of Land Development, under the when Minister of Agriculture, Dudley Senanayake, who was a contemporary at St Thomas' College, having been two years senior. However, after a falling out with Dudley Senanayake, he was appointed Assistant Government Agent of the Kalutara District. Resigned shortly thereafter from the Civil Service and retired to his farm in Tabbowa in the Puttalam District becoming a gentleman farmer.

Political career

Sri Lanka Freedom Party

Member of parliament
C. P. de Silva was brought into active politics by Herbert Sri Nissanka, who was the secretary of the Sri Lanka Freedom Party. He contested in the general elections in 1952 and was elected to parliament from Polonnaruwa from the Sri Lanka Freedom Party defeating the incumbent P. L. Bauddhasara.

Cabinet Minister and Leader of the House
He was re-elected in the 1956 general elections and was appointed leader of the house in parliament by S. W. R. D. Bandaranaike who then appointed him to his cabinet as the Minister of Lands, Land Development and Agriculture. In the Bandaranaike cabinet, C. P. de Silva emerged as the most senior member after Bandaranaike and served as acting prime minister during the absence of the latter. In 1957, he personally drove a bulldozer to safely breach the Minneriya tank during the 1957 floods.

He became severely ill at a cabinet meeting on 25 August 1959 after consuming a glass of milk and was flown to the United Kingdom for medical treatment. During his absence Bandaranaike was assassinated on 26 September 1959 and Wijeyananda Dahanayake, who was the acting leader of the house was appointed as Prime Minister by the Governor General. De Silva returned to the island soon after and was appointed as Minister of Agriculture and Lands in the caretaker cabinet. On 12 December the Freedom Party met and elected De Silva as the new President of the party succeeding Bandaranaike. Thereafter the party executive committee authorized him to request the Governor General to remove Dahanayake and replace him with De Silva as the prime minister of the caretaker government. The Governor General acknowledged receipt of the request but did not act on it. Soon after De Silva resigned from his cabinet ministry.

Leader of the Opposition
Although not fully recovered, he became the leader of the Sri Lanka Freedom Party and led the party in the 1960 March general elections. Weaken by inter-party rivalries, the Freedom Party was able to gain 46 seats while the United National Party led by Dudley Senanayake gained 50 seats and formed a minority government which lasted only three months. He became the Leader of the Opposition. The government lost the throne speech and Senanayake resigned advising the Governor General to dissolve parliament and call for fresh elections. C. P. de Silva, met the Governor General, Sir Oliver Goonetilleke and stated that he could form a government. Sir Oliver Goonetilleke did not accept de Silva offer and dissolved parliament.

Minister of Power and Irrigation
Sri Lanka Freedom Party selected Bandaranaike's widow, Sirima Bandaranaike as party leader for the 1960 July general elections. The party won the election and formed a government, with Sirima Bandaranaike becoming the first women prime minister. C. P. de Silva, appointed Minister of Power and Irrigation, and leader of the house, once again serving as the senior member of the cabinet until, he was surpassed by the prime minister's nephew, Felix Dias Bandaranaike who soon became the prominent figure in the government. C. P. de Silva was soon sidelined by the Bandaranaike's based on caste issues. He briefly served as Minister of Finance in 1962. He established two schools in Minneriya Central College and the Polonnaruwa Royal Central College.

Crossing over
He soon faced attacks from within his own party and was criticized in parliament by Jaya Pathirana. Citing the Press Take Over Bill which was aimed at taking over its main critic, Associated Newspapers of Ceylon Limited by the government, on 3 December 1964, C. P. de Silva led thirteen SLFP parliamentarians that included Mahanama Samaraweera, P. P. Wickremasuriya, Wijayabahu Wijayasinha, Edmund Wijesuriya, A. H. de Silva, Indrasena de Zoysa, Chandrasena Munaweera, W. G. M. Albert Silva, S. B. Lenawa, Lakshman de Silva, Dr. Edwin Tillekeratne, Sir Razik Fareed, and Robert Singleton-Salmon crossed over to the opposition. The government of Sirima Bandaranaike lost the throne speech by one vote and a general election was called for in March 1965.

Sri Lanka Freedom Socialist Party
C. P. de Silva formed the Sri Lanka Freedom Socialist Party which in coalition with the United National Party (UNP) contest and won the general elections in 1965. He was appointed Minister of Lands, Irrigation and Power; and the Leader of the House in the new national government of Prime Minister Senanayake. During his tenor, he established the River Valleys Development Board to develop the Udawalawe Project and the introduced the Mahaweli Development Authority Act in February 1970 initiating the Mahaweli Development programme. He had contested from the Minneriya district from March 1960, and was re-elected in July 1960 and 1965. He lost his seat in the 1970 general elections to Ratna Deshapriya Senanayake, having been a member of parliament for 18 years.

Death
C. P. de Silva died on 9 October 1972, he was a lifelong bachelor. As per his last wishes, his ashes were dispersed in Minneriya. His brother Merril de Silva contested and won from Minneriya in the general elections in 1977.

References

1912 births
1972 deaths
Finance ministers of Sri Lanka
Agriculture ministers of Sri Lanka
Members of the 2nd Parliament of Ceylon
Members of the 3rd Parliament of Ceylon
People from Southern Province, Sri Lanka
Sinhalese civil servants
Alumni of Dharmasoka College
Alumni of S. Thomas' College, Mount Lavinia
Alumni of the Ceylon University College
Power ministers of Sri Lanka